I've Got a Voice is the second studio album of the Austrian singer Nadine Beiler, released on May 13, 2011. The first single released from the album "The Secret Is Love" was released on  3 January 2011, it peaked to number 3 on the Austrian Singles Chart.

Track listing

Charts

Release history

References

2011 albums
Nadine Beiler albums